The 2000 Sybase Open was a men's tennis tournament played on indoor hard courts at the San Jose Arena in San Jose, California in the United States and was part of the ATP International Series of the 2000 ATP Tour. It was the 112th edition of the tournament ran from February 7 through February 13, 2000. Second-seeded Mark Philippoussis won his second consecutive singles title at the event.

Finals

Singles
 Mark Philippoussis defeated  Mikael Tillström 7–5, 4–6, 6–3
 It was Philippoussis' first title of the year and the 8th of his career.

Doubles
 Jan-Michael Gambill /  Scott Humphries defeated  Lucas Arnold Ker /  Eric Taino 6–1, 6–4
 It was Gambill's first title of the year and of his career. It was Humphries' first title of the year and of his career.

References

Sybase Open
SAP Open
Sybase Open
Sybase Open
Sybase Open